Escœuilles is a commune in the Pas-de-Calais department in the Hauts-de-France region of France.

Geography
A farming village situated 15 miles (24 km) west of Saint-Omer, at the junction of the N42  and D216 roads.

Etymology
The village name first appears in 1084 as Seules. In the year 1200, it had the name Esquelles, then Eskelle, Scules, Escueles, Esquieulles, Ecueil, Escoueuille and finally Escoeuilles.

Population

Places of interest
 The church of the Assumption, dating from the thirteenth century.
 The chapel, built in 1877.
 The war memorial.

See also
Communes of the Pas-de-Calais department

References

Escoeuilles